Gourcy is a town in the Gourcy Department in the province of Zondoma in Burkina Faso. It is the capital of Zondoma Province.

References

Populated places in the Nord Region (Burkina Faso)
Zondoma Province